The Embassy of Finland in London is the diplomatic mission of Finland in the United Kingdom.

It is located in Belgravia, 38 Chesham Place. Belgravia is known to be a home for many embassies.

The Grade II listed building was built by Thomas Cubitt in the 1830s and had many occupants until it became the Finnish embassy in 1975.

The ambassador of Finland to the United Kingdom, since 2021, is Jukka Siukosaari. His career at Finnish Ministry for Foreign Affairs includes postings to Tokyo, Buenos Aires, London, Pretoria, Rome and Dublin. He has also worked as the Secretary General at the Office of the President of the Republic of Finland.

The Ambassador’s Residence is in 14 Kensington Palace Gardens.

Ambassadors

Gallery

See also 
 Finland–United Kingdom relations

References

External links
 Official site

Finland
Diplomatic missions of Finland
Finland–United Kingdom relations
Grade II listed buildings in the City of Westminster
Belgravia